is a railway station on the Sōya Main Line in Toyotomi, Teshio District, Hokkaido, Japan, operated by Hokkaido Railway Company (JR Hokkaido). It is numbered "W74".

Lines
Sōya and Sarobetsu limited express services stop at this station.

Layout
The unstaffed station has two side platforms serving two tracks on the otherwise single line.

Adjacent stations

History
The station opened on 25 September 1926.

External links

  

Stations of Hokkaido Railway Company
Railway stations in Hokkaido Prefecture
Railway stations in Japan opened in 1926